Deer Wan is an album by Kenny Wheeler featuring performances by Wheeler with Jan Garbarek, John Abercrombie, Dave Holland and Jack DeJohnette with Ralph Towner appearing on one track. The album was recorded in 1977 and released on the ECM label.

Reception
The Allmusic review by Scott Yanow states "Kenny Wheeler's beautiful sound on trumpet and his wide range are well-displayed on his four compositions, three of which are given performances over ten minutes long...  Wheeler emphasizes lyricism and romantic moods on this fine set of original music".

Track listing
All compositions by Kenny Wheeler.

 "Peace for Five" – 16:27
 "3/4 in the Afternoon" – 5:50
 "Sumother Song" – 11:25
 "Deer Wan" – 10:04

Personnel
Kenny Wheeler – trumpet, flugelhorn
Jan Garbarek – tenor saxophone, soprano saxophone
John Abercrombie – electric guitar, electric mandolin
Dave Holland –  bass
Jack DeJohnette – drums
Ralph Towner – 12-string guitar (track 2)

References

Kenny Wheeler albums
1978 albums
ECM Records albums
Albums produced by Manfred Eicher